Loon Lake 235 is an Indian reserve of the Loon River First Nation in Alberta, located within Northern Sunrise County and the Municipal District of Opportunity No. 17. It is 5 kilometres southwest of Loon Lake. In the 2016 Canadian Census, it recorded a population of 555 living in 147 of its 157 total private dwellings.

References

Indian reserves in Alberta
Loon River First Nation